San Marino competed in the Summer Olympic Games for the first time at the 1960 Summer Olympics in Rome, Italy. Nine competitors, all men, took part in five events in three sports.

Cycling

Four male cyclists represented San Marino in 1960.

Individual road race
 Salvatore Palmucci
 Domenico Cecchetti
 Sante Ciacci
 Vito Corbelli

Team time trial
 Salvatore Palmucci
 Sante Ciacci
 Domenico Cecchetti
 Vito Corbelli

Shooting

Four shooters represented San Marino in 1960.

50 m pistol
 Aroldo Casali
 Spartaco Cesaretti

Trap
 Leo Franciosi
 Guglielmo Giusti

Wrestling

 Vittorio Mancini - 16th place

References

External links
Official Olympic Reports

Nations at the 1960 Summer Olympics
1960
Summer Olympics